Sacred Heart School of Halifax is Catholic school in Halifax, Nova Scotia. The school offers co-ed education for JP-Grade 6 and single-gender education for grades 7–12. Sacred Heart School of Halifax is part of a global network of Sacred Heart schools around the world. Founded in 1849, Sacred Heart School of Halifax is the oldest continually operating school in Halifax.

History
Sacred Heart Convent was founded in 1849 by the Society of the Sacred Heart. It was originally one of two convent schools in the city and educated the daughters of the elite for many years.

See also
Network of Sacred Heart Schools

References

External links

Maritime Conservatory of Performing Arts (in The Canadian Encyclopedia)

Preparatory schools in Nova Scotia
Private schools in Nova Scotia
Educational institutions established in 1849
Elementary schools in Nova Scotia
Middle schools in Nova Scotia
High schools in Halifax, Nova Scotia
Catholic secondary schools in Nova Scotia
Sacred Heart schools
1849 establishments in Nova Scotia
Single-gender schools